Mandovi Marine patrol crafts are 15 metre long patrol crafts with glass reinforced plastic hull built by Mandovi Marine Pvt LTD, Indore, India.

Description
They are powered by twin MWM TD-232 V-12 diesels which each develop 370 hp, which are coupled to a Hamilton 1341 water jet unit. The crafts have a top speed  of 25 knots. They are armed with a 7.62-mm MG and a Furuno FR 8030 Radar however they resemble oilfield crew boats. They are hi-speed version of Mandovi Marine (12.5-Meter) Class Patrol Craft in service of Indian Coast Guard.

Operators
Mauritius
The boats of this class which entered in service of National Coast Guard (NSG) organisation, Mauritius are Barracuda, Castor, Marlin, Polaris, Sirius, Capella, Rigel, Pollux and Canopus. Ordered on 24 July 1987, they were gifted by the Indian Government. The first two units were delivered early in 1989, second batch of three with some modifications on 1 May 1990 and the last four at the end of 1990. As of 2010, only four remained in inventory and the class has been succeeded by Praga Class Patrol Boat introduced in 2000.

Mauritania
The same basic design was utillised to build four boats for the Islamic Republic of Mauritania by M/s Madovi Marine.

Specification
Displacement: 15 tonnes
Length: 15 metre
Breath: 3.6 metre
Draught: 0.8 metre
Power: 2 Cummins diesels 
Propulsion: 2 Hamilton water-jets, 750 bh 
Speed: 24 knots
Range: 240 nautical miles at 12 knots
Crew: 8

See also
Mandovi Marine (12.5-Meter) Class Patrol Craft

References

Patrol boat classes